Aníbal Marrero Pérez (October 3, 1949 – January 25, 2005) was a Puerto Rican politician. He was a member of the Senate of Puerto Rico from 1984 until he resigned in 2000 amidst corruption charges.

Biography
Aníbal Marrero was born on October 3, 1949, in Bayamón, Puerto Rico, to Víctor Marrero and Jacinta Pérez. He received his bachelor's degree in business administration with a major in management and education from the University of Puerto Rico.

After graduating, Marrero worked as a teacher for the Puerto Rico Department of Education from 1970 to 1972. In that year, he became a school director in Bayamón until 1973. In 1974, he started working as deputy director of the Ecotactics Program for the Municipality of San Juan. In 1977, he was also named as regional director of the Consumer Affairs Department in Bayamón.

Marrero began his political career in 1978, as part of the Municipal Assembly of Bayamón. He presided over the Assembly until 1984 when he resigned to take over the Senate seat left by Guillermo Campos Ayala in the District of Bayamón. In 1988, he was elected as Senator and was then reelected in 1992 and 1996.

That term he was chosen by his fellow senators as President pro tempore, under Charlie Rodríguez. He also presided the Commissions of Banking, Consumer Affairs, and Public Corporations. In 2000, he was forced to resign amidst accusations of corruption. However, after his resignation, no legal action was taken against him.

Marrero was married to Carmen M. Santos, and had two children: Aníbal and Ricardo. He died on January 25, 2005, of a cardiac arrest.

See also

Senate of Puerto Rico

|-

References

External links
Biografía Aníbal Marrero Pérez on SenadoPR

1949 births
2005 deaths
Members of the Senate of Puerto Rico
People from Bayamón, Puerto Rico
Presidents pro tempore of the Senate of Puerto Rico
University of Puerto Rico alumni
20th-century American politicians